Jewel In The Crown is the eighteenth studio album by folk rock band Fairport Convention which is viewed by many as the best record produced by the line-up which had been formed in 1985 for the one-off project Gladys' Leap. While few of the tracks were self-penned, it features tracks from many of the band's favourite writers including Huw Williams, Ralph McTell and Julie Matthews.

History
The album was recorded in two stages. Initially a few tracks were partially recorded with recording engineer Tim Matyear. Matyear's departure from Dave Pegg's Woodworm Studio led to producer-engineer Mark Tucker being hired to continue with recording the remaining material. At a very late stage in the production, producer Gus Dudgeon made a contribution to the mixing of the songs "Jewel In The Crown", "The Naked Highwayman", "Closing Time" and "Red Tide". Some subtractive edits were made to "The Naked Highwayman" as Dudgeon felt the song was too long. Overall it is generally considered one of the most satisfying of Fairport's releases since Nine. It was also the last studio album recorded by the Nicol, Pegg, Mattacks, Allcock and Sanders line-up.

Track listing
 "Jewel in the Crown" (Julie Matthews) – 3:32
 "Slip Jigs and Reels" (Steve Tilston) – 4:52
 "A Surfeit of Lampreys" (Maartin Allcock) – 3:19
 "Kind Fortune" (Traditional; arranged by Fairport Convention) – 2:37
 "Diamonds and Gold" (Ben Bennion, Maartin Allcock) – 4:14
 "The Naked Highwayman" (Steve Tilston) – 4:32
 "The Islands" (Ralph McTell, Maartin Allcock) – 4:33
 "The Youngest Daughter" (Traditional; arranged by Maartin Allcock) – 2:06
 "London Danny" (Jez Lowe) – 3:50
 "Summer in December"  (Ric Sanders) – 4:57
 "Travelling by Steam" (Huw Williams) / "Travel by Steam" (Traditional, arranged by Ric Sanders) – 3:47
 "She's Like the Swallow"  (Traditional; arranged by Maartin Allcock) – 3:14
 "Red Tide" (Rob Beattie) – 4:36
 "Home Is Where the Heart Is" (Clive Gregson) – 4:41
 "Closing Time" (Leonard Cohen) – 5:40

Production
 Produced by Fairport Convention at the band's Woodworm Studios
 Mixed and engineered by Mark Tucker and Fairport, with contributions from Gus Dudgeon
 "Jewel In The Crown", "Diamonds And Gold", "The Naked Highwayman", "The Islands", "Red Tide" and "Closing Time" were mixed by Gus Dudgeon and Mark Tucker.

Personnel
Fairport Convention
 Simon Nicol – lead vocal, acoustic guitar and 12-string guitar
 Maartin Allcock – electric and acoustic guitar, keys, bouzar, bodhran, accordion, triangle, backing vocals
 Ric Sanders – violins
 Dave Pegg – bass guitar, acoustic bass, electric guitar, mandolin, backing vocals
 Dave Mattacks – drums, percussion

References

1995 albums
Fairport Convention albums
Albums produced by Gus Dudgeon